Francis Greenslade (born 3 October 1962 in Honiara, Solomon Islands)  is an Australian comedic actor. He also teaches acting.

Early life
In the 1980s, Greenslade studied at the University of Adelaide where he first met Shaun Micallef. They performed together in the university's Footlights Club. Greenslade was the President of the South Australian Debating Association (SADA) in 1992 and represented University of Adelaide at the World Universities Debating Championship where he was the Best Speaker in 1988.

Career
Greenslade has performed with Micallef in many television shows including The Micallef Program, Welcher & Welcher, Micallef Tonight and Shaun Micallef's Mad as Hell. They both also appeared in Full Frontal.

Greenslade has also appeared on children's comedy Pig's Breakfast, SeaChange, Blue Heelers, Water Rats, The Games and Marshall Law as well as in the 2003 Australian feature film Take Away (with Stephen Curry). He stars as Brian Gross in the Seven Network show Winners & Losers alongside Denise Scott who plays his on-screen wife Trish. In the 2022 Netflix series Irreverent, he plays Ron.

Greenslade has appeared in numerous productions for the Malthouse Theatre, the Melbourne Theatre Company, Playbox Theatre, State Theatre Company of South Australia and the Magpie Theatre Company.

Greenslade teaches acting including drama at The National Theatre Drama School and at the Film & Television Studio International

Community work
Greenslade was a guest host at The Impossible Orchestra: 24 Hour Concert where Australia and New Zealand musicians played a world-first 24-hour symphony concert to raise awareness of the Care Aware campaign.

Personal life
Greenslade and his wife, Louise, have three children. He plays a range of musical instruments; clarinet, keyboard, accordion, guitar, ukulele and recorder. He is also a debater and has won various awards.

Despite sharing a surname, he is not related to his Shaun Micallef's Mad as Hell co-star Tosh Greenslade.

Filmography

Movies
Keeper
Introducing Gary Petty
Theatre Sports
Fergus McPhail

Television
The Leftovers
East of Everything
Winners & Losers
The Bazura Project
The Librarians
All Saints
City Homicide
Newstopia
Soul Mates
Bastard Boys
Marshall Law
Micallef Programme
Micallef Tonight
Pig's Breakfast
Blue Heelers
SeaChange
Water Rats
The Games
Full Frontal
Shaun Micallef's Mad as Hell

Narration

Greenslade is a narrator of audio books including:-
Death Delight by Gabrielle Lord
The Gizmo by Paul Jennings
48 Shades of Brown by Nick Earls
The Art of War for Executives by Sun Tzu; Donald G. Krause
The Book of Secrets by Tom Harper
Lost temple by Tom Harper
Bachelor kisses by Nick Earls
Walter wants to be a werewolf! by Richard Harland
Lethal factor by Gabrielle Lord
HMAS Sydney by Tom Frame
Backs to the Wall by G.D. Mitchell

Theatre
Melbourne Theatre Company
The Madwoman of Chaillot
Urinetown
Things We Do for Love
 Man the Balloon
Blabbermouth
The Odd Couple
Shakespeare in Love

Sydney Theatre Company
 Navigating

Playbox
 Chilling and killing my Annabel Lee
 Waking Eve
 Competitive Tenderness
Babes in the Wood

Malthouse
 Optimism 
The Odyssey
Tartuffe

State Theatre Company (SA)
The Club
School for Scandal
Così
The Tempest
Accidental Death of an Anarchist
Marat/Sade
The Comedy of Errors

Magpie Theatre
 Funerals and Circuses
 Chutney 
 Snap 
 Prince of Knumbskulls
 Radio Dazef

Arena Theatre Company
The Emperor's New Clothes

Red Shed
Desert

Patch
Evensong for Antarctica

The Marat Pack
The Ages of Man
Bishop Takes Knight
As Time Goes By
Not One But Two

Other
The Boy from Oz (with The Production Company)
33 Variations (Comedy Theatre, Melbourne

Honours
In 2017, Greenslade's portrait by artist/animator Phil Meatchem was a finalist in the Archibald Prize. The 153 x 117 cm portrait has him sitting on a couch dressed in a suit, looking out at the viewer, that Meatchem said was "inspired by the elegant Oscar-night celebrity portraits by photographer Mark Seliger."

References

External links

1962 births
Living people
Australian male television actors
Australian male film actors
Australian male stage actors
Australian male voice actors
University of Adelaide alumni
Audiobook narrators